Podžaga is a small settlement at the southern end of the Mišja dolina valley southwest of Velike Lašče in central Slovenia. The entire Municipality of Velike Lašče is part of the traditional Lower Carniola region and is included in the Central Slovenia Statistical Region.

References

External links

Podžaga on Geopedia

Populated places in the Municipality of Velike Lašče